Winogradskyella endarachnes is a Gram-negative, aerobic, rod-shaped and motile  bacterium from the genus of Winogradskyella which has been isolated from the alga Endarachne binghamiae.

References

Flavobacteria
Bacteria described in 2020